The 1956 State of the Union Address was given by Dwight D. Eisenhower, the 34th president of the United States, on Friday, January 5, 1956, to both houses of the 84th United States Congress.  He said this in it, "There has been broad progress in fostering the energies of our people, in providing greater opportunity for the satisfaction of their needs, and in fulfilling their demands for the strength and security of the Republic."

See also
1956 United States presidential election

References

State of the Union addresses
Presidency of Dwight D. Eisenhower
Speeches by Dwight D. Eisenhower
84th United States Congress
State of the Union Address
State of the Union Address
State of the Union Address
State of the Union Address
January 1956 events in the United States